Zdeněk Vaněk (born 19 July 1968 in Jaroměř) is a Czech former handball player who competed in the 1988 Summer Olympics and in the 1992 Summer Olympics.

References

1968 births
Living people
Czech male handball players
Olympic handball players of Czechoslovakia
Handball players at the 1988 Summer Olympics
Handball players at the 1992 Summer Olympics
Czechoslovak male handball players
People from Jaroměř
Sportspeople from the Hradec Králové Region